The Cambridge Scientists Anti-War Group (CSAWG) was a left wing pacifist group set up in 1932.

In 1937 responding to concerns about the use of poison gas bombs, the CSAWG organised an experiment in the Trinity College room of John Fremlin to determine the rate at which a gas might leak into a sealed room. However Jack Haldane queried the rigour of the scientific methodology.

Notable members of CSAWG
 Frederick Sanger
Maurice Wilkins

References

Scientific organisations based in the United Kingdom
Peace organisations based in the United Kingdom
1932 establishments in England
Organisations based in Cambridge
Left-wing politics in the United Kingdom
Organizations established in 1932